Charles Gunter Gallagher (September 21, 1925 – June 20, 2007) was a farmer and political figure in New Brunswick, Canada. He represented Carleton County and then Carleton North in the Legislative Assembly of New Brunswick as a Progressive Conservative member from 1970 to 1987.

He was born in Centreville, New Brunswick, the son of James Isaac Gallagher and May Irene Gunter. Gallagher was educated at the Nova Scotia Agricultural College, Macdonald College and McGill University. In 1948, he married Kathleen Frances Olmstead. Gallagher was speaker for the provincial assembly from 1985 to 1987. He served in the province's Executive Council as Minister of Education from 1976 to 1982 and Minister of Health from 1982 to 1985. Gallagher was defeated by Fred Harvey when he ran for reelection in 1987. From 1991 to 1993, he was a member of a Commission examining Rural Land Use and Environmental Concerns in the province. In 2007, he died at Saint John.

References 
 Canadian Parliamentary Guide, 1987, PG Normandin

1925 births
2007 deaths
Progressive Conservative Party of New Brunswick MLAs
Speakers of the Legislative Assembly of New Brunswick
McGill University Faculty of Agricultural and Environmental Sciences alumni